The Laikipiak people were a community that inhabited the plateau located on the eastern escarpment of the Rift Valley in Kenya that today bears their name. They are said to have arisen from the scattering of the Kwavi by the Maasai in the 1830s.They were one of two significant sections of that community that stayed together. The other being the Uasin Gishu with whom they would later ally against the Maasai. Many Maa-speakers in Laikipia County today claim Laikipiak ancestry, namely those among the Ilng'wesi, Ildigirri and Ilmumonyot sub-sections of the Laikipia Maasai.

c.1830 Origins
According to narratives told to Thompson in 1883, a community referred to as "Wa-kwafi"(Kwavi) fragmented following a series of misfortunes that befell them "about 1830...".

Thompson notes that the original home of the 'Wa-kwafi' was "the large district lying between Kilimanjaro, Ugono and Pare on the west, and Teita, and Usambara on the east. The Kwavi had been attacked by the Maasai while enfeebled by their 'misfortunes', the result being that the community was broken up and scattered to various corners.

According to Maasai traditions recorded by MacDonald (1899), the Lykipia found Ogiek on the plateau and brought them under their patronage.

Territory
According to Maasai traditions recorded by MacDonald, the territory of the Laikipiak extended over the plateau today known as Laikipia following the fragmentation of Loikop society. Chauncy Stigand made notes based on information he had 'received from Masai, Samurr, Rendile and Borana, concerning the 'old Laikipia Masai' whom he states were known as Loikop. He notes that;

Ascendance
Narratives collected by Stigand in northern Kenya during the period 1877-1919, portray a period of increasing power for the 'old Laikipia Maasai' whom he calls Loikop.

c.1870 Maasai - Laikipia war

Combatants
Thompson (1883) noted that the 'Wa-kwafi' of Guas'Ngishu and those of Lykipia, having increased in numbers and grown bold, allied together to make war on the Maasai. He was advised that this was about fifteen years before then i.e c.1870. Hollis in his account of the Maasai recorded similar narratives occurring about the same time. He notes "that about 1850 the Turkana drove the most westerly branch of the Masai from the west, to the south of (Lake Turkana)". He states that "somewhere about the same period - at the time an old man can remember according to the native expression - the Masai dwelling on the Uasin Gishu plateau attacked those of Naivasha". The Maasai of Naivasha would later ally with those of Kilimanjaro.

Berntsen (1979) notes that elders of the Purko-Kisongo Maasai relate that it was warriors of the Il Aimer age-set (c. 1870–1875) who blunted the attack of their northern neighbours the Ilaikipiak and then destroyed them as a social unit. The elders do not attribute the victory to the Maasai warriors to superior military strength but rather to the prophetic-ritual leadership of the famous laibon Mbatian who exploited his influence among several Purko-Kisongo sections to unite all the warriors of the Purko-Kisongo against the Ilaikipiak.

Prelude
According to Purko informants, the Purko and the Laikipiak allied to raid the Uasin Gishu during the warriorhood of the Il Nyankusi age-set (c. 1860s - 1870s). These traditions imply a joint or at least a coordinated attack. More recently, there has been scholarly speculation that some Purko sought charms and medicines from the prophet of the Ilaikipiak - Koikoti ole Tunai - whose kraal was located much closer to the Purko than was Mbatian's.

Following one of the Purko-Ilaikipak raids on the Uasin Gishu, the warriors of the Purko and those of the Ilaikipiak fell out over the distribution of the captured cattle. Details vary but a consistent element of the narrative claims that Kuiyoni, the speaker of the Purko warriors, instructed his warriors to take more than their share of cattle. Incensed, the Ilaikipiak warriors, guided by Koikoti, raided the Purko and the other sections around Naivasha, driving them completely from the region. A number of accounts suggest that the Ilaikipiak allied with the Uasin Gishu to exact revenge on the Purko.

The demoralized warriors and elders of the Purko then turned to their chief prophet Mbatian for aid. They appealed to him using various methods and were eventually successful in drawing him into the conflict. Mbatian directed warriors from other,uninvolved sections of the Purko-Kisongo to join the Purko and the other shattered sections to resist and destroy the Ilaikipiak.

Conflict
Many accounts of the late 19th century capture the conflict between the Maasai and the Laikipia/Uasin Gishu Kwavi alliance. They all note that this conflict ended in the subsequent annihilation of the latter.

Stigand for instance noted that the final extinction of the Laikipia arose due to conflict with the southern Maasai. His account includes reference to the Laikipia warriors jumping or being forced off a cliff which is similar to accounts later recorded in the folklore of modern Kenyan communities.

Background
Prof. Ciarunji Chesaina (1991) wrote of conflict that occurred between "Sikyinet'ab Kaplong'ole" (the clan of long'ole district) and the Masai. The clan of long'ole are said to have lived on a 'flat-topped' mountain which was surrounded by a thick, thorny forest that was difficult to penetrate. This clan was strong, they are said to have defeated a number of neighboring clans becoming 'bonnikab bororionoto' (loosely rulers of their community). They subsequently became proud and in this air of arrogance pitted themselves against their distant rivals - the Maasai.

They are said to have goaded the Maasai to war by sending them a 'sharpening stone' with which to sharpen their spears. When the initial invitation to war was turned down, the warring Long'ole clan sent a second messenger with an even bigger sharpening stone.

Battle preparations

Battle

Joseph Thompson in 1883, came across a deserted village which he called Dondolè.

Diaspora
According to the narratives told to Thompson, the Kwavi were scattered and dispersed as migrants into a number of areas and communities, including;
 Taveta
 Kahe
 Mount Meru (Arusha-wa-juu)
 Among the Wazeghua
 Nderserriani
 Ngurumani

MacDonald noted that the survivors of this conflict were at that time scattered remnants in 'Nandi, Kavirondo or Ketosh'.

Johnston (1886), recognized that the Loikop were "divided into many classes, tribes and even independent nations". He grouped separately the divisions of the Masai and those of the Kwavi, noting that the later were "settled agriculturalists". The Kwavi divisions that he recognized were;

 En-jemsi and the district of Lake Baringo
 Laikipia 
 Kosova
 Lumbwa (near Kavirondo)
 Aruša
 Méru (near Kilimanjaro)
 Ruvu river
 Nguru (south)
Straight et al. note that the Samburu by way of several landscape features, "understand their relationship to ancestors both victorious and assimilated". Of the Laikipia, they state - "...And when the Laikipiak were finished [wiped out] they went to other sub-clans and other ethnic groups made them their own. So the Laikipiak did not finish, they are still among many people...And they are also among us Lmasula [a Samburu section]".

Another Samburu elder of Laikipia heritage, asked rhetorically; Is there anywhere that there aren't Laikipiak?

Many Maa-speakers in Laikipia County, namely among the Ilng'wesi, Ildigirri and Ilmumonyot claim to be descendants of Ilaikipiak today (although most identify primarily as Maasai). Oral historical records suggested that these groups scattered into the forests of Mt Kenya and elsewhere following the defeat of the Laikipiak, where they subsisted through hunting and foraging until rebuilding their herds off the back of the ivory trade, as well as livestock theft. This period led to their stigmatisation by Samburu and other neighbouring groups as 'Dorobo'.

References

Ethnic groups in Kenya